Rudolf Borchardt (9 June 1877, Königsberg, Prussia – 10 January 1945, Trins, Austria) was a German essayist, poet and cultural historian. He is perhaps best known for translating Dante's Divine Comedy into his own type of German language. Ernst Schmidt called Borchardt "one of the most problematic figures in early twentieth-century European cultural history" and "one of Germany's finest poets."

Life 
Borchardt was born into a middle class Jewish family, the son of Robert Martin Borchardt (1848–1908) and his wife Rose (née Bernstein) (1854–1943). He was educated at the Royal School in Wesel. According to one of his biographers, Kai Kauffmann, he had a "narcissistic personality" from a young age.  Borchardt studied theology in Berlin before changing to study classical philology and archeology.  He continued these studies at the University of Bonn and the University of Göttingen in 1896, and also studied German and Egyptology.

In 1898 Borchardt began to work on a doctoral dissertation on Greek poetry that was not completed.  After personal crises and a serious illness in February 1901 Borchardt was decided against a university career.  In January 1902 Borchardt fell out with his father because he had refused to allow him monthly payments and did not subsidise his expensive lifestyle.  On 17 February he traveled to Rodaun and visited Hugo von Hofmannsthal, whom he admired.  From 1903 he lived with a few interruptions in Tuscany and lived in a villa in Monsagrati near Lucca.

First World War 
In 1906 Borchardt married the painter Karoline Ehrmann in London and returned with her to Italy, from where, as a sought-after speaker, he went on numerous lecture tours to Germany until 1933.  From the beginning of the First World War he returned to Germany and was an infantry officer before being promoted to the German General Staff where he served as an intelligence officer.  During the war he gave speeches in which he advocated the imposition of Germanic order on all of European culture.  After the divorce from Karoline in 1919, Borchardt married Marie Luise Voigt in 1920, a niece of Rudolf Alexander Schröder, with whom he had been friends for a long time.  From this marriage there were four children.

Literary style 
Borchardt was inspired by the writings of contemporaries, mainly that of von Hofmannsthal.  He travelled widely and visited von Hofmannsthal several times in Switzerland.  One such meeting, in 1902, resulted in Borchardt writing of a series of essays on the subject of his friend and mentor's works.  He was a popular public speaker and his lectures attracted large crowds.  From 1903, during a visit to Italy, Borchardt began writing prose.  The first works of fiction were allegorical in style and strongly poetic in language.

In 1921 Borchardt returned to Italy.  His literary output became more political and polemical, partly in order to make his income more secure, but he managed to produce a collection of stories, The Hopeless Race: Four Contemporary Tales (1929), which found a large audience across Europe.

In the early 1930s he wrote his only full-length novel.  As the political situation in Germany worsened and the Weimar Republic grew ever weaker, Borchardt continued his political writings, many of which displayed strong fascist overtones.

Due to his Jewish heritage, Borchardt lived a withdrawn life in Italy from 1933, unable to visit loved ones in Germany.  Yet in April 1933 he handed a copy of his Dante's Divine Comedy to Mussolini, who admired Borchardt's work.  In August 1944, Borchardt and his wife, Marie Luise, were arrested by the SS in Italy and transported to Innsbruck.  After their release, they hid in the Tyrol.

For a long time Borchardt's writings were out of print, at first suppressed in Germany by the Nazi regime and then simply forgotten.  However, there has been something of a renaissance in scholarly interest in his work.

Notes 

1877 births
1945 deaths
People from Königsberg, Bavaria
German essayists
20th-century German historians
German poets
20th-century German poets
German male poets
University of Bonn alumni
University of Göttingen alumni
German translation scholars
German expatriates in Italy
20th-century German male writers
German Army personnel of World War I